Grey Forest is a city in northwest Bexar County, Texas, United States. The population was 483 at the 2010 census. It is part of the San Antonio Metropolitan Statistical Area.

Geography
Grey Forest is located on Scenic Loop Road about 25 miles northwest of Downtown San Antonio.

Demographics

As of the census of 2000, there were 418 people, 179 households, and 127 families residing in the city. The population density was 565.9 people per square mile (218.1/km). There were 211 housing units at an average density of 285.6/sq mi (110.1/km). The racial makeup of the city was 98.80% White, 0.24% Native American, 0.72% from other races, and 0.24% from two or more races. Hispanic or Latino of any race were 7.66% of the population.

There were 179 households, out of which 28.5% had children under the age of 18 living with them, 59.2% were married couples living together, 8.9% had a female householder with no husband present, and 28.5% were non-families. 22.3% of all households were made up of individuals, and 6.1% had someone living alone who was 65 years of age or older. The average household size was 2.34 and the average family size was 2.75.

In the city, the population was spread out, with 19.9% under the age of 18, 5.7% from 18 to 24, 26.3% from 25 to 44, 33.5% from 45 to 64, and 14.6% who were 65 years of age or older. The median age was 44 years. For every 100 females, there were 95.3 males. For every 100 females age 18 and over, there were 91.4 males.

The median income for a household in the city was $47,614, and the median income for a family was $51,875. Males had a median income of $37,188 versus $29,464 for females. The per capita income for the city was $26,475. About 0.7% of families and 1.9% of the population were below the poverty line, including none of those under age 18 and 8.5% of those age 65 or over.

Education
Residents are zoned to schools in the Northside Independent School District.

Students are zoned to:
 Helotes Elementary School (Helotes) 
 Hector Garcia Middle School (San Antonio) 
 Sandra Day O'Connor High School (Helotes)

References

Cities in Bexar County, Texas
Cities in Texas
Greater San Antonio